Gimnástica Segoviana Club de Fútbol is a Spanish football team based in Segovia, the capital of the namesake province, in the autonomous community of Castile and León. Founded in 1928 as Sociedad Deportiva Gimnástica Segoviana, it plays in Segunda División RFEF – Group 1, holding home games at Estadio La Albuera, which has a capacity of 6,000 spectators (5,326 in terrace areas and 674 in the tribunes).

History
On 28 June 1928 the club named S.D. Gimnástica Segoviana was officially created with Francisco del Barrio being elected as its first president.

After playing since its foundation between Tercera División and the Regional leagues, Gimnástica Segoviana promoted to Segunda División B for the first time in 1999, but the club could not remain in the league and was immediately relegated after its first season in the third tier.

In 2011, Gimnástica segoviana repeated success, this time after beating Arroyo CP, SD Noja and SD Logroñés in the promotion play-offs, but again was relegated in the next season. Five years later, the club would come back to the third tier after beating Atlético Malagueño by a huge 4–1 overall in the promotion play-offs.

Club background
Sociedad Deportiva Gimnástica Segoviana - (1928–2006)
Gimnástica Segoviana Club de Fútbol - (2006–)

Season to season

3 seasons in Segunda División B
2 seasons in Segunda División RFEF
55 seasons in Tercera División

Current squad

Former players
 Albert Stroni
 Quique Estebaranz

Former coaches
 Casuco
 Abraham García

References

External links
Official website 
Futbolme team profile 

Football clubs in Castile and León
Association football clubs established in 1928
1928 establishments in Spain
Sport in Segovia